If/Then is a musical with a libretto by Brian Yorkey and a theatrical score by Tom Kitt, directed by Michael Greif. It tells the story of a 38-year-old woman named Elizabeth who moves back to New York City for a fresh start.

If/Then began previews on Broadway at the Richard Rodgers Theatre on March 5, 2014, opened on March 30, 2014, and closed on March 22, 2015, a total of 401 performances and 29 previews. The cast recording was released by Masterworks Broadway on June 3, 2014, and debuted at number 19 on the Billboard 200, the highest-charting Broadway cast recording since the cast recording of The Book of Mormon was released in 2011.

If/Then started its national tour in Denver, Colorado, on October 13, 2015. On January 27, 2016, Jackie Burns replaced Idina Menzel as Elizabeth for the remainder of the tour.

Productions
After a developmental lab in April, 2013, featuring Idina Menzel and directed by Michael Greif, If/Then staged an out-of-town tryout at the National Theatre, Washington, D.C. from November 5 to December 8, 2013. The musical began previews on Broadway at the Richard Rodgers Theatre on March 5, 2014, and officially opened on March 30.

The Broadway production is directed by Greif, with choreography by Larry Keigwin, sets by Mark Wendland, costumes by Emily Rebholz, lighting by Kenneth Posner, and orchestrations by Michael Starobin. The original cast includes Menzel as Elizabeth, LaChanze as Kate, James Snyder as Josh, and Anthony Rapp as Lucas, along with Tamika Sonja Lawrence, Jenn Colella, Jerry Dixon, and Jason Tam.

A national tour, with Menzel again in the starring role, began in Denver in October 2015.

A South Korean production is set to play in Hongik Daehakro Art Center Grand Theater from December 8, 2022 to February 26, 2023.

Synopsis
NOTE: An intermission is taken after "Surprise."

Elizabeth Vaughn returns to New York City to start her life over. She's thirty-eight, recently divorced, twelve years away from her beloved New York: a city planner who has only taught city planning and has never planned a city. On her first day back ("What If?"), she meets two friends in the park—Lucas, a friend from her undergrad years (and onetime lover, long ago, who now identifies as bisexual), and Kate, her spirited new neighbour. Lucas wants her to come with him to meet some of his fellow activists, gathering signatures at a table across the park. But Kate wants her to get coffee and listen to a sexy guy playing guitar nearby. Kate calls her "Liz"—the two of them having decided the previous night, over wine, that Elizabeth should have a new name for her new life. Lucas, for his part, likes "Beth".

We see her go both ways—with Kate, as "Liz", and with Lucas, as "Beth". Her lives diverge in that moment. And we follow them both.

Liz
Liz goes with Kate, listens to the sexy guitar guy, meets a handsome doctor just back from his second tour overseas (now in the Army Reserves) who would like to get to know her, brushes him off, gets a phone call from a number she doesn't recognize, and doesn't take the phone call. She agrees to go with Kate to Brooklyn the next night to hear the sexy guitar guy's band. On the way there, Liz meets the soldier again on a subway—by chance, she insists, but Kate insists that "It's a Sign", and Liz finally takes his phone number. Liz and Josh (the doctor) meet a third time in the park ("A Map of New York") and she agrees to a dinner date. After that date, she tells him that statistics suggest there's not much chance the two of them will have a successful relationship, but he insists that "You Never Know". And later on, after he hits it off with Kate and her girlfriend Anne, and sets Lucas up with David, a doctor friend ("Ain't No Man Manhattan"), Liz finally admits he might have a chance. After deciding to spend the night with him ("What the Fuck"), the following morning she confesses her fears to him but vows to take the leap with him anyway ("Here I Go"). Some weeks later, at her thirty-ninth birthday party, she tells Josh she is pregnant and he proposes marriage ("Surprise"). They get married ("This Day") and Josh faces up to his impending fatherhood ("Hey, Kid"). Two years later, Liz has Lucas and David babysit her son Jake, which prompts the two of them to consider starting a family together, and, when Lucas wavers, David urges him to commit to their relationship ("Best Worst Mistake"). A couple of years later, Liz and Josh have a second son, Cooper, due to which Josh used his last deferral. Soon, Josh is called up to serve with the Army overseas where he is killed in action ("I Hate You"). Liz struggles to move on after his death ("You Learn to Live Without"), not wanting to confront her loss until David helps her to do so ("What Would You Do?"), and she realizes that each person, every day, is "Always Starting Over". Soon, she meets Kate and Lucas in the park, some five years after that first fateful day, and she also reconnects with her old grad school friend Stephen (whose phone call she didn't take that day five years ago, and who hasn't been back in her life until now). Stephen has a job offer for her, a great one, and she accepts, ready to build something new ("What If? (Reprise)").

Beth

Beth goes with Lucas. She gets an incoming call from an unknown number. Upon Lucas's prompting that the area code of the unknown phone number is that of New York City, Beth takes the phone call, which turns out to be from her grad school friend Stephen, offering her a job. This annoys Lucas, who never liked Stephen, and we learn that Lucas has been holding a torch for Elizabeth all the time she's been away. She deflects his advances, but she does agree to go with him to a street action his group is holding the next night in Brooklyn. As the two reminisce about their college days, Lucas kisses her; as a result, the handsome soldier who was approaching her backs off. The morning after attending that protest, Beth meets Stephen at the Department of City planning, where he offers her a job as deputy director, which she takes and soon comes to love ("A Map of New York"). Lucas and the NYCC protest the redevelopment of the Far West Side project—a project which Beth is overseeing. Stephen asks Beth to convince Lucas to back down from the project. She promises Lucas to introduce him to an editor that she knows if he helps her get the project through to the City Council. The project does go through and is passed by the City Council; Beth, Stephen, and the rest of the Department of City Planning celebrate its completion ("Ain't No Man Manhattan"). Beth and Stephen prove great partners at work—but when the chemistry spills over, they have a romantic encounter, and Beth immediately regrets the moment and worries that it may mean she needs to quit her job. She calls Lucas, who comes over to her apartment and comforts her. One thing leads to another, and Beth and Lucas hook up ("What the Fuck?"). The following morning, Lucas asks to be more than a friend to her ("You Don't Need to Love Me"), but she gently sends him on his way. Kate and Anne, along with Beth's new protégée Elena, convince Beth not to quit and to seize a sudden opportunity to be Director of City Planning ("No More Wasted Time"). Some weeks later, at a small birthday gathering, Beth confesses to these three women that she is pregnant ("Surprise"), and even before she can tell Lucas that she's with child and he is the father, he proposes marriage to her. We next see her, not pregnant, and alone, "Walking by a Wedding" and wondering if she'll ever meet the man she's meant to love. Two years later, she meets Lucas in a park, and we learn they haven't spoken since she had an abortion without first consulting him. Beth tries to mend their friendship, but Lucas, filled with many regrets, walks away ("Some Other Me"). Later, after Elena leaves Beth's employ to move west with her husband and new baby, Beth is reunited with Stephen, who wants her to come work with him again, and possibly more. She turns him down but reflects on the life she has made for herself ("You Learn to Live Without"). After a routine business trip turns terrifying, when her plane to London makes an emergency landing in Portland, Maine, Beth calls Lucas and insists they belong in each other's lives. Lucas discloses that Kate and Anne are facing a crisis in their marriage and are considering divorce. She rushes home to Kate and Anne, urging them to "Love While You Can". Some weeks later, Beth meets her friends in the park, telling them she's decided to run for City Council—to start over again. A handsome doctor approaches, just back from his third tour overseas, and asks her out. In this life, at this moment, she says yes ("What lf? (Reprise)").

Musical numbers

 Act I
 "Prologue / What If?" - Elizabeth, Busker, Kate, Lucas, Josh and Company
 "It's a Sign" – Kate and Passengers
 "A Map of New York" – Stephen, Beth, Kate and Company
 "You Never Know" – Josh
 "Ain't No Man Manhattan" – Lucas and Activists
 "What The Fuck?" – Elizabeth
 "Here I Go" – Liz and Josh
 "You Don't Need to Love Me" – Lucas
 "No More Wasted Time" † – Beth, Kate, Anne, Elena
 "Surprise" – Company

 Act II
 "This Day / Walking by a Wedding" – Kate, Anne, Liz, Josh, and Company
 "Hey, Kid" – Josh
 "Some Other Me" – Beth and Lucas
 "Best Worst Mistake" – Lucas and David
 "I Hate You" – Liz and Josh
 "A Map of New York (Reprise)" – Stephen
 "You Learn to Live Without" – Elizabeth
 "The Moment Explodes" ‡ – Beth, Architect, Flight Attendant, Passengers
 "Love While You Can" * – Beth, Kate, Anne
 "What Would You Do?" – David
 "Always Starting Over" – Liz
 "Finale / What If? (Reprise)" – Company

† In the pre-Broadway production, this song is not performed; instead, "The Story of Dick and Jane", was performed by Kate and company
‡ In the pre-Broadway production, this song is moved and performed between "This Day / Walking By A Wedding" and "Hey Kid"
* In the pre-Broadway production, this song is not performed; instead, a different version of "No More Wasted Time", was performed by Kate and Anne

Notable casts

Reception

While at the National Theatre, Peter Marks, reviewing for The Washington Post praised Menzel, calling her "an earthy star with heavenly pipes" but said the play makes "it difficult to determine at any given moment which of the stories of Elizabeth's fate we're in". Marks noted that the show has the ingredients that it needs for success: "It's a winning blob, and it provides a lot of engaging elements, from Mark Wendland's becoming minimalist set, with rotating skeletons of city apartments and handsome retractable fire escapes, to Emily Rebholz's sleek and taste-drenched costumes. The score — a far sunnier composition than the songwriters worked out for their Pulitzer Prize-winning musical about mental illness, 'Next to Normal' — gives Tony-winner Menzel the power ballads in which her fans from 'Wicked' and 'Rent' will exult."

The Broadway production received primarily mixed reviews, with the consensus being that the cast shone, but the score and book were still unclear. Ben Brantley of The New York Times gave a mixed review but stated that Idina Menzel "brings an anxious intensity to a featherweight part". Mark Kennedy of ABC News said, "An uneven — maybe not completely finished — show opened Sunday at the Richard Rodgers Theatre with an intriguing, ambitious premise and a leading lady with a shockingly good voice, but a clumsy story and too few impressive songs". Peter Marks of The Washington Post summed up his review with, "If/Then is an enjoyable, beautifully sung, at times deeply touching experience, built on a structure that never completely works." Robert Hofler of The Wrap gave an optimistic review, comparing the show's non-traditional structure to Stephen Sondheim's Company, saying "Today, audiences seeing those classic shows understand perfectly what's going on. Audiences seeing them in the original productions – take it from me – were very confused and exasperated" and that "...it's an intriguing book, but one that Yorkey might tinker with beyond opening night, just as the books of 'Merrily We Roll Along' and 'Follies' went through many revisions after their respective Broadway premieres. In other words, see 'If/Then' now so you can have the fun of making comparisons to its future revivals, of which there will be many". Elysa Gardner of USA Today was positive, writing, "Yorkey's book and lyrics match the probing compassion of Normal without indulging in that show's preciousness. The characters here are more accessible and likable, from James Snyder's rugged but tender Josh to Anthony Rapp's wry Lucas, Elizabeth's longtime friend. LaChanze brings infectious verve to the role of Kate, a lesbian schoolteacher who evolves from a stock comic-buddy type into a compelling individual. As for the leading lady, Menzel seems both grounded and energized by the opportunity to play a grownup who learns that there really are no ever-afters. There is poignance in that discovery, but a sense of liberation as well, and If/Then captures both to moving, invigorating effect."

Despite mixed reviews, the show enjoyed strong box-office returns. During its first full week of performances, the show debuted in the top 10 with $931,268. The show was highlighted by Entertainment Weekly as one of the hits of the 2013–2014 season. By the last week of April the show was playing to over 97% capacity and was noted as one of the two highest-grossing new musicals. In May, If/Then was noted by Variety as being one of "the spring openers that have shown box office strength all along," and was still bringing in over a million dollars at the box-office every week. Also in May, Deadline Hollywood highlighted the fact that If/Then was defying the odds as one of the few original musicals to perform strongly in recent years, with most original musicals only lasting around a month. Deadline.com went on to comment on the strength of Menzel's name and fan-base as being behind the show's financial success. Nevertheless, the production likely closed at a loss.

Streaming series

While the show was on Broadway, James Snyder hosted a Broadway.com vlog titled Hey Kid showing what went on backstage. The series was originally expected to run for an eight episode single season, but was extended to 12 episodes due to popularity, before being extended again. It ended up running for three seasons, or 24 episodes, making it one of the longest-running Broadway.com vlogs ever.

Awards and nominations

References

External links

2013 musicals
Broadway musicals
Original musicals
LGBT-related musicals
Musicals by Brian Yorkey
Musicals by Tom Kitt (musician)
Plays about abortion